The following is a list of episodes of the SIC television series, Golpe de Sorte, created by Vera Sacramento. The series debuted on May 27, 2019. The series follows the life of Céu, a woman who sells fruit in a market and is surrounded by a maelstrom when she wins Euromilhões.

Series overview

Episodes

Season 1 (2019)

Season 2 (2019)

Season 3 (2019)

Season 4 (2020-21)

References 

Golpe